Gary Jeamsen Correa Gogin (born May 23, 1990 in Lima, Peru) is a Peruvian footballer who plays as a left winger for Atlético Grau on loan from Universitario in the Peruvian First Division.

International career
He was called to play for the Peru national under-17 football team and qualified for the 2007 FIFA U-17 World Cup in South Korea.

References

External links

1990 births
Living people
Footballers from Lima
Association football wingers
Peruvian footballers
Club Universitario de Deportes footballers
FBC Melgar footballers
Juan Aurich footballers
Ayacucho FC footballers
Cienciano footballers
Real Garcilaso footballers
Comerciantes Unidos footballers
Club Deportivo Universidad de San Martín de Porres players
Peruvian Primera División players